The Las Vegas Academy of the Arts is a magnet high school located in Downtown Las Vegas, Nevada. Students are accepted through an audition process and claim a major pertaining to performing arts or visual arts.

History

Las Vegas High School 
The Las Vegas Academy's campus is located on the site of the first high school in Las Vegas. The school uses two of the buildings that were constructed in 1930 and opened in the fall of 1931. Las Vegas High School was the first high school in Las Vegas, and its location caused controversy at the time. Many residents believed the school was too far away from the small population at the time, which has changed as the city grew around the school. The school originally had three buildings: the tri-level Main building on the corner of 7th St. and Bridger Ave., the Gymnasium, and a third building that housed manual arts (shop classes) and in later years government classes. It was torn down in 1969. The two remaining buildings are listed as the Las Vegas High School Academic Building and Gymnasium on the National Register of Historic Places, representing Las Vegas' best example of art-deco architecture of the 1930s. The school's outer appearance has been maintained but the interior has been changed since its original construction.

Las Vegas Academy
In 1992, plans for a magnet school for the arts were announced by Assistant Superintendent Noor Mura, and on August 23, 1993, Las Vegas High School was re-opened as the Las Vegas Academy for International Studies and Performing Arts by founding principal Bob Gerye. Visual Arts was added the following year. Starting with only 735 students, the student body has since grown to an excess of 1700 students attending the school pursuing majors in the performing and visual arts. The CCSD Board of Trustees officially changed the school's name to Las Vegas Academy of the Arts in November 2014. Las Vegas Academy has been honored by the U.S. Department of Education as both a New American High School  and a Blue Ribbon School. The Arts Schools Network (ASN) awarded LVA the Outstanding Arts School 2013-2014 and Exemplary Arts School status for 2014–2016.

LVA Programs
The school divides its student base into four conservatories: art, dance, music, and theatre.

Theatrical venues

Academy Theatre Black Box
LVA Performing Arts Center
Las Vegas Academy Lowden Theater for the Performing Arts

Notable alumni
Molly Bernard, actress
Leah Dizon, singer and model active in Japan 
Matthew Gray Gubler, actor
Julianne Hough, singer/dancer
Dasha Nekrasova, actress
Ne-Yo, R&B artist
Sizzy Rocket, singer
Baron Vaughn, actor/comedian
Rutina Wesley, actress

References

External links

SAH Archipedia Building Entry

Magnet schools in Nevada
High schools in Las Vegas
Educational institutions established in 1992
School buildings completed in 1930
School buildings completed in 1931
Public high schools in Nevada
Music venues in Nevada
1992 establishments in Nevada